Audrey Yong Pei Lin (Yong Pei Lin, born October 2, 1994) is a Singaporean sailor. She placed 25th in the women's RS:X event at the 2016 Summer Olympics.

References

External links
 
 
 
 

1994 births
Living people
Singaporean female sailors (sport)
Olympic sailors of Singapore
Sailors at the 2016 Summer Olympics – RS:X
Sailors at the 2010 Summer Youth Olympics
Sailors at the 2014 Asian Games
Asian Games competitors for Singapore
21st-century Singaporean women
Singaporean windsurfers
Female windsurfers